Rron Broja (born 9 April 1996) is a Kosovan professional footballer who plays as a defensive midfielder for Kosovan club Drita and the Kosovo national team.

Club career

Early career and return to Trepça '89
Broja was part of the youth team of Trepça '89 until January 2015, where he was transferred to the youth team of the Belgian team Gent, where then in July of the same year he was loaned to Belgian First Division B club Deinze, but failed to make a debut. At the beginning of the 2016–17 season, he returns to Trepça '89 but as a senior team player and helped the team to be declared champion in the same season.

Shkupi
On 11 January 2018, Broja joined Macedonian First Football League side Shkupi. One month later, he made his debut in a 0–3 home defeat against Shkëndija after being named in the starting line-up.

Partizani Tirana
On 29 June 2019, Broja signed a two-year contract with Kategoria Superiore club Partizani Tirana. Eleven days later, he made his debut with Partizani Tirana in the 2019–20 UEFA Champions League first qualifying round against the Azerbaijani side Qarabağ after coming on as a substitute at 68th minute in place of William Cordeiro Melo.

Drita
On 3 August 2021, Broja signed a two-year contract with Football Superleague of Kosovo club Drita and received squad number 4.

International career

Under-21

Albania
On 8 June 2015, Broja received a call-up from Albania U21 for the friendly matches against Kazakhstan U21 and Sweden U21. Eight days later, he made his debut with Albania U21 in friendly match against Sweden U21 after being named in the starting line-up.

Kosovo
On 13 March 2017, Broja through an interview confirmed that he switched his allegiance to Kosovo U21. Eight days later, he received a call-up from Kosovo U21 for a 2019 UEFA European Under-21 Championship qualification match against Republic of Ireland U21, and made his debut after being named in the starting line-up.

Senior
On 22 January 2018, Broja received his first call-up from national senior team in a friendly match against Azerbaijan. The match however was cancelled two days later, which prolonged his debut. His debut with Kosovo came on 12 January 2020 in a friendly match against Sweden after coming on as a substitute at 64th minute in place of Ismet Lushaku.

References

External links

1996 births
Living people
Sportspeople from Mitrovica, Kosovo
Kosovan footballers
Kosovo under-21 international footballers
Kosovo international footballers
Kosovan expatriate footballers
Kosovan expatriates in Belgium
Kosovan expatriates in North Macedonia
Kosovan expatriates in Albania
Albanian footballers
Albania under-21 international footballers
Albanian expatriates in Belgium
Albanian expatriates in North Macedonia
Association football midfielders
K.A.A. Gent players
Challenger Pro League players
K.M.S.K. Deinze players
Football Superleague of Kosovo players
KF Trepça'89 players
FC Drita players
Macedonian First Football League players
FK Shkupi players
Kategoria Superiore players
FK Partizani Tirana players